Herkules Jonssons storverk ("The Labours of Hercules Jonsson") was the Sveriges Television's Christmas calendar and Sveriges Radio's Christmas Calendar in 1969. The screenplay was written by Tage Danielsson.

Plot 
The series is set in a Stockholm suburb where a family, consisting of the mother, the father and their son reside. The mother knows the magical phrase "Överliggande kramaxel å kalasvev å bubbla förknasare" (made up of humorously altered names of several car parts), allowing the father Herkules and the son, Bara Johnsson, to switch places with each other; the father to become the son and vice verse.

References

External links 
  at SVT Play 
 
 

1969 radio programme debuts
1969 radio programme endings
1969 Swedish television series debuts
1969 Swedish television series endings
Sveriges Radio's Christmas Calendar
Sveriges Television's Christmas calendar
Television shows set in Sweden